was a Japanese visual kei metal band from Tokyo, formed on 14 May 2006. Rather than following the usual sound of visual kei, they were a darker, heavier band, which combined metal with melodious tones.

History
Guitarist Erina left the group in September 2009 and they went on hiatus, until announcing that they were officially disbanding on 13 March 2010 and that the same line-up would reform as a new band. That same month, vocalist Mikaru started a project called Digras; its other members have not been announced yet.

In January 2011, bassist Ivy (now going by Tomoa) formed the band Remming. In July, Mikaru and drummer Denka (now going by Syu) formed the band Black Line, and Erina is in VII-Sense.

Dio Distraught Overlord reunited in April 2016 for B7Klan's 10th anniversary European tour.

Members

Past members 
 Seiya – drums (support)
Shigure – guitar (support)

Discography
Albums and extended plays
 Heaven's Call (27 February 2008)
 Dictator (26 December 2008)

Singles and maxi singles
 "Garasu no Umi" (14 May 2006)
 "Byakuya ni Moyuru Hana" (9 December 2006)
 "Byakuya ni Moyuru Hana ~Shi to Byoudou no Tsumi no Naka de~" (9 May 2007)
 "Byakuya ni Moyuru Hana ~Nanji, Ware wa Zennou no Mono Nari~" (10 October 2007)
 "Carry Dawn" (8 October 2008)
 "Coma Gold" (3 May 2009)
 "Coma Gold ~The God Dead~" (5 May 2009)
 "Byakuya ni Moyuru Hana" (5 April 2016)

DVDs
 Embrace of Distraught (8 August 2007)
 Forbidden Truth (unknown)
 Tour Dictator (22 April 2009)
 Tour Dictator Fool's Mate Limited Edition (22 May 2009)
 Final Call -Memorial DVD- (13 March 2010)

See also
 List of gothic metal bands
 List of melodic death metal bands
 List of visual kei musical groups

References

External links 

 Dio – Distraught Overlord on Myspace
 
 Nippon Project interview

2006 establishments in Japan
2010 disestablishments in Japan
Japanese gothic metal musical groups
Japanese melodic death metal musical groups
Japanese metalcore musical groups
Musical groups disestablished in 2010
Musical groups established in 2006
Musical groups from Tokyo
Visual kei musical groups